Frank Der Yuen (February 20, 1912 – September 17, 1984) was an American aeronautical engineer of international acclaim who resided in Honolulu, Honolulu County, Hawaii. He was the inventor of the jet bridge (passenger boarding bridge), among other inventions.  He graduated from the Massachusetts Institute of Technology in 1933.

Recognition
In his recognition, the Frank Der Yuen Aviation Scholarship is awarded by the Pacific Aviation Museum Pearl Harbor.

References

1912 births
1984 deaths
Aeronautical engineers
Massachusetts Institute of Technology alumni
Engineers from Hawaii
20th-century American engineers